Khin Khin Gyi  is a Burmese physician and government official who is currently serving as the director of Myanmar's Central Epidemiology Unit and Eradication Department. She is also a Ex-senior spokeswoman for the Ministry of Health and Sports.

During the COVID-19 pandemic in Myanmar, Khin Khin Gyi collected and managed real-time information in order to keep the public informed about the Health Ministry's response to COVID-19. Residents of Myanmar were allowed to ask questions and state their concerns on her Facebook account. She was named in The Irrawaddy's article "Ten Myanmar Women Who Inspired Us in 2020".

References

Living people
Burmese public health doctors
Burmese women physicians
Burmese government officials
Year of birth missing (living people)
Women public health doctors